Giacomo Stucchi (born 20 February 1969) is an Italian politician, member of the Northern League.

Biography 
Stucchi was elected to the Chamber of Deputies uninterruptedly from 1996 to 2008. In those years, Stucchi has been a member of the EU policies Committee and of the Constitutional Affairs Committee.

In March 2013, he is elected to the Senate and in June he is elected president of the COPASIR, the Parliamentary Committee for the Intelligence and Security Services and for State Secret Control, deputed to survey and oversee the activities of the Italian intelligence agencies.

After 22 years of uninterrupted presence in Parliament, he is no longer nominated for the 2018 general elections, since he has been excluded from the League lists.

Stucchi is politically considered to be very close to former President of Lombardy Roberto Maroni.

References

External links 
Files about his parliamentary activities (in Italian): XIII, XIV, XV, XVI, XVII legislature

1969 births
Living people
Lega Nord politicians
20th-century Italian politicians
21st-century Italian politicians
Members of the Chamber of Deputies (Italy)